Taberdga is an ancient town in the Aurès Mountains of northeast Algeria. Situated on the edge of a steep cliff, the town's well-preserved ruins include a mosque and other traditional stone architecture in the Berber tradition. The town was written about by M.W. Hilton-Simpson, a traveler, collector and ethnographer who travelled extensively in North and Central Africa in the early part of the twentieth century.
 Taberdga was listed as a national heritage site in 2008.

External links
 Taberdga on Global Heritage Network (GHN)

Notes

Archaeological sites in Algeria